RISC-ISO (stylized as RISCISO) (Pronounced RISK – I – S – O or RISK eye-so) was an online warez group, founded in approximately 1993, dedicated to distributing newly released copyrighted software, games and movies.  The acronym "RISC" stood for Rise in Superior Couriering, and "ISO" referred to a file format commonly used for the storage and transfer of disc images although the group RISC and RiSCiSO were two completely separate groups.  The organization operated until the Operation Site Down raids in the summer of 2005.  American authorities are still searching for the organization's ring leader Sean Patrick O'Toole, after he failed to appear in an American court in February 2006. He placed a call to his friend and group leader Sandy Fury, wishing her a happy birthday and an apology and then disappeared at Heathrow Airport.

In all, a total of 19 individuals have been charged with a 15-count indictment brought by the U.S. Attorney's Office under Patrick Fitzgerald in U.S. District Court in Chicago.  The lead prosecutor for the Government in this case was Assistant U.S. Attorney Pravin Rao. (AAP, 2006).

, Sean O'Toole is still a fugitive and no one has heard from him in 2 years. Linda Waldron remains a fugitive in her home in Barbados. In 2008, The executive editor of Wiley & Sons, publishers of Kevin Mitnick and Bruce Schneier books, were in talks with Fury about a publishing deal but another book on Piracy was released around that time and all plans stalled.

An FBI report released in 2011 showed that the materials available for download on one of Risciso's servers exceeded $6.5 million.

See also 
Operation Site Down
RISCISO Indictments

Notes

References
AAP. "US seeks accused Aussie internet pirate." The Age. 23 February 2006. online, last consulted 8 September 2010
enigmax [pseud.] "Despite Worldwide Search, RISCISO Warez Leader Escapes US Justice." Torrent Freak. 18 May 2007. online, last consulted 8 September 2010
Jorge Gonzalez. "USA – Copyright Infringer Sentenced to 30 Months in Prison!" zeropaid. 2 May 2008. online, last consulted 8 September 2010
K. C. Jones. "Warez Site Operator Sentenced To 30 Months: Prosecutors said David Fish's sentencing is linked to the largest and most successful global criminal enforcement actions ever taken against organized piracy." InformationWeek. 1 May 2008. online, last consulted 8 September 2010

External links
  

Warez groups